Rossington All Saints Academy is a coeducational secondary school and sixth form located in Rossington, South Yorkshire, England.

Originally known as Rossington High School, in 2001 it became a voluntary aided Church of England school and was renamed Rossington All Saints Church of England School. The school also gained specialist status as a Sports College. In 2011, the school converted to academy status and was renamed Rossington All Saints Academy. Today the school is sponsored by the School Partnership Trust in partnership with Doncaster Metropolitan Borough Council and the Diocese of Sheffield.

Rossington All Saints Academy offers GCSEs, BTECs and Cambridge Nationals as programmes of study for pupils, while students in the sixth form have the option to study from a range of A-levels and further BTECs.

Doncaster Collegiate Sixth Form
The sixth form is part of the Doncaster Collegiate Sixth Form which combines the sixth form offering from Ash Hill Academy, De Warenne Academy, Don Valley Academy, Rossington All Saints Academy and Serlby Park Academy.

References

External links
 

Secondary schools in Doncaster
Church of England secondary schools in the Diocese of Sheffield
Academies in Doncaster
Delta schools